The Toyota Carina ED is a compact car manufactured by Japanese automaker Toyota in 1985 as a companion to the 1984 Carina sedan. It was positioned as the four-door Celica, with a similar focus on luxury found on larger Toyota hardtop sedans, like the Toyota Crown and the Toyota Cresta. It was the counterpart of the Corona EXiV. Its design sought to emulate the hardtop four-door coupé styling of large American and European sedans, resulting in a small, low cabin with longer front and rear ends. The ED's B-pillar stood up in the middle with no purpose other than to hinge the rear door on; it was not attached to the roof side of the cabin. The ED achieved huge sales in Japan, and other Japanese manufacturers introduced the Mazda Persona, Nissan Presea, and Mitsubishi Emeraude around the same time. "ED" is the initials of "Exciting" and "Dressy". When the Carina ED was discontinued, the Toyota Brevis appeared for the market segment served by the Carina ED.



First generation (ST160; 1985)

The first generation was a new design direction, emphasizing styling and comfort over practicality and economy. The Carina ED was introduced in May 1985. The Celica platform was used and attention was placed on handling and performance. The initial lineup offered two 1.8-litre engines and one twin cam 16-valve 2.0. The 1S-iLU had single-point injection while the 1S-ELU used multi-point injection, as did the top of the line 3S-GELU. With the later net rating, power figures drop down to  respectively. Fog lamps were made standard August 1987, and the 1S-ELU engine was replaced by the 2.0-litre 3S-FE, producing  JIS net. In May 1988 the 1S-iLU was replaced by the 1.8-litre 4S-Fi, with  JIS net; this meant that the engine lineup now consisted entirely twin cams.

When the first Carina was introduced in 1970, it was identified as a four-door Celica, but sold at a different Toyota Japan dealership called Toyota Store as a Corona-sized sedan with the performance-enhanced image of the Celica. The Corona was exclusive to Toyopet Store, and the Celica was exclusive to Toyota Corolla Store. The introduction of the Carina ED represented a reintroduction of the performance reputation of the Celica, once again as a four-door version.

The hardtop approach was also used on the yet smaller Corolla/Sprinter platform, called the Corolla Ceres and the Sprinter Marino; these cars were offered for consumers who wanted the luxurious approach offered by the Toyota Crown hardtop and sedan, as well as the Mark II (four-door hardtop and sedan), Cresta (4-door sedan) and Chaser (four-door hardtop) but at a lower price and reduced tax liability based on the vehicles size and engine displacement.

Second generation (ST180; 1989)

The restyled second generation was introduced 1989 and luxury equipment content increased. Four-wheel steering appeared on the top level offerings and styling was updated more closely resemble the twin introduction of the Toyota Corona EXiV, and shared it appearance with the Toyota Corona and Toyota Carina. Along with some minor changes in August 1988, electronic fuel injection was made standard on all engines offered as the 4S-FE replaced the 4S-Fi. This generation was the last true hardtop as the next generation had a complete B-pillar extending all the way to the roof.

Third generation (ST200; 1993)

The four wheel drive system introduced on this generation was borrowed from the Toyota Celica GT-Four. Four wheel steering was available. The trim level designations were 1800V, 2000X, 2000GT and 2000GT-4WD. As a result of styling changes, sales improved in comparison to the second generation. A driver side airbag appeared September 1995, as well as speed sensitive door locks and climate control air conditioning. A passenger side airbag appeared June 1996. Production ended due to economic conditions April 1998.

References

External links
 Carina ED（First） - Toyota Official Website 
 Carina ED（Second） 
 Carina ED（Third）

Carina ED
Cars introduced in 1985
Front-wheel-drive vehicles
All-wheel-drive vehicles
Vehicles with four-wheel steering
Cars discontinued in 1998